Califortalis hirsutifrons is a species of ulidiid or picture-winged fly in the genus Califortalis of the family Ulidiidae.

References

Ulidiidae